The Third Force Party (TFP) was a political party in Ghana during the Third Republic (1979–1981).

In the 18 June 1979 presidential election, TFP candidate John Bilson won 2.8% of the vote.

References 

Defunct political parties in Ghana
Political parties established in 1979
1979 in Ghana